Charles Grier Sellers Jr. (September 9, 1923 – September 23, 2021) was an American historian. Sellers was best known for his book The Market Revolution: Jacksonian America, 1815–1846, which offered a new interpretation of the economic, social, and political events taking place during the United States' Market Revolution.

Early life and education
Sellers was born in Charlotte, North Carolina, on September 9, 1923. His mother, Cora Irene (Templeton), worked for a church society; his father, Charles Grier Sellers, was an executive at Standard Oil and was descended from a family of "two-mule farmers". Sellers was an avid birder; in 1937, at age 14 he co-founded the Mecklenburg Audubon Club with Elizabeth Clarkson and Beatrice Potter, which later became the Mecklenburg Audubon Society. He earned a Bachelor of Arts from Harvard College in 1945, where he lived in Grays Hall during his freshman year. His graduation was delayed until 1947 by service in the 85th Infantry Regiment of the 10th Mountain Division (the ski troops) of the United States Army. He served in the army from 1943 to 1945 and achieved the rank of staff sergeant. He was awarded his Doctor of Philosophy from the University of North Carolina at Chapel Hill in 1950.

Career
Sellers first worked as assistant professor in the history department of the University of Maryland from 1950 to 1951. He then taught at Princeton University for eight years. In 1958, he moved to the University of California, Berkeley, where he was promoted to associate and then full professor. He was honored as a fellow by the Center for Advanced Study in the Behavioral Sciences at Stanford University in 1960 and 1961. He won a Guggenheim Fellowship in 1963. One year later, he was a visiting professor at El Colegio de Mexico. In 1967 he won the Bancroft Prize in American History for Volume II of his biography of President James K. Polk, titled James K. Polk: Continentalist, 1843–1846. He later served as the Harold Vyvyan Harmsworth Professor of American History at Oxford University during the 1970–71 academic year.

Sellers was a member of the Southern Historical Association, the Organization of American Historians (OAH), and the American Historical Association (AHA).

Sellers was arrested in the Jackson, Mississippi airport on July 21, 1961, as a part of the Freedom Rides. He was later profiled in the nonfiction book Breach of Peace for his role in the event.

The Market Revolution: Jacksonian America, 1815–1846
When it was first published in 1991, Charles Sellers’ book The Market Revolution: Jacksonian America, 1815–1846 represented a major scholarly challenge to what had been, until then, one of the central tenets of U.S. history: that of democracy and capitalism marching together, in lockstep. The book was originally commissioned to be part of the Oxford History of the United States series, but its criticism of the historiographical ideal of consensual, democratic capitalism in the U.S. led Oxford University Press to publish it outside the series. One of the book's central arguments is that historians have largely ignored "the stressed and resistant Jacksonian majority", choosing instead to sing the praises of capitalism and ignore the evidence that democracy in the U.S. rose largely in resistance to capitalism, rather than in accord with it. Sellers' book – which synthesized a wealth of extremely diverse sources to make its case – has profoundly impacted all subsequent debates surrounding the Market Revolution in the United States.

Personal life
Sellers was married three times. His first two marriages ended in divorce. He was married to Carolyn Merchant until his death. He had three children.

Sellers died on September 23, 2021, in Berkeley, California, aged 98.

Awards
1960–1961. Fellow, Center for Advanced Study in the Behavioral Sciences, Stanford University.
1963 Guggenheim Fellowship
1967 Bancroft Prize in American History for James K. Polk: Continentalist, 1843–1846.

Works

 (Bancroft Prize)

Charles G. Sellers, "Boom for President," in Charles Sellers, ed., Andrew Jackson: A Profile (New York: Hill and Wang, 1971), pages 57–80.
 (7th Edition 1992)

References

External links
"New Southern Accents", The New York Times, Hodding Carter, September 18, 1960
"Charles G. Sellers, American Historian"
Charles Sellers: From the Freedom Rides to the Free Speech Movement
Breach of Peace: Portraits of the 1961 Mississippi Freedom Riders - book's website

1923 births
2021 deaths
Writers from Charlotte, North Carolina
University of California, Berkeley faculty
Harvard University faculty
Harold Vyvyan Harmsworth Professors of American History
21st-century American historians
21st-century American male writers
Harvard College alumni
University of North Carolina at Chapel Hill alumni
Historians from California
American male non-fiction writers
United States Army non-commissioned officers
United States Army personnel of World War II